Luce Line Trail is a , shared-use path in Minnesota, United States, that stretches from Cosmos to Minneapolis. The trail system was built after 1995, when the Luce Line Railroad was abandoned west of Interstate 494. The previous line extended  to Gluek. The multi-use trail has varying surface features, though it is primarily made up of crushed limestone or aggregate base, and the section from Cosmos to Cedar Mills is undeveloped, as are the sections from just west of Hutchinson to Winsted and east of Plymouth. The trail is maintained by the Minnesota Department of Natural Resources west of Vicksburg Lane where it is named Luce Line State Trail. East of Vicksburg Lane, it is maintained by the Three Rivers Park District and named Luce Line Regional Trail.

Route description

State trail

Western portion
The trail begins in Cosmos, by Thompson Lake. There is a parking lot, a campground, and facilities. At this point, the trail leaves the town and is undeveloped with a natural surface. After , it reaches Cedar Mills and transforms into an aggregate surface. It becomes paved and goes by Otter Lake as it enters Hutchinson. It parallels the Crow River and passes under several bridges, including MN 15. It leaves town and crosses over MN 22 on a bridge. It passes under Minnesota Highway 7 again, and continues east. It goes south of Swan Lake and into Silver Lake. It leaves Minnesota Highway 7 and continues northeast, and intersects several farm roads. Just west of Winsted, the trail turns south on a new section to avoid the Winsted Airport. The western segment ends at County Road 20.

Eastern portion
After following Winsted streets, the trail passes south of Winsted Lake and a parking lot. It continues due east, and passes by several roads. It goes by a parking lot at Vega Avenue. It enters Watertown, and crosses the Crow River. It leaves Watertown and goes by several lakes. It changes directions a few times and goes into the small hamlet of Lyndale in Independence. It crosses county roads 92, 110, and 19, and south of Maple Plain. It enters the Lake Minnetonka area, and passes by Stubbs Bay. Past this point, no snowmobiles are allowed. The scenery begins to be more suburban, and it crosses local roads. It passes under Brown Road, and over Orono Orchard Road. It passes US 12 and the railroad tracks, and Wayzata Boulevard on a restored bridge. It goes south, and parallels US 12 for a while. It passes just north of Wayzata, and tunnels under CSAH 101. It passes into Gleason Lake. This section ends at Vicksburg Lane.

Regional trail
East of Vicksburg Lane, the trail is called the Luce Line Regional Trail and is managed by Three Rivers Park District. It passes south of Parkers Lake and has several spur trails serving the lake and the surrounding neighborhoods. It enters a tunnel under I-494, and goes by several industries afterward. It crosses Xenium Lane on a bridge and leaves the industrial area. It crosses several defunct railroad crossings. It crosses under MN 55 and turns slightly southeast. It enters the Medicine Lake area. Due to right of way issues, the trail narrows to about half of its width. It intersects the Medicine Lake Regional Trail, and parallels 13th Avenue. It goes under US 169. It leaves Plymouth Avenue and goes back to the railway tracks. It crosses Winnetka Avenue and turns south to avoid the Golden Valley Country Club. It turns east again, paralleling Country Club Drive and turns north on Douglas Drive. It crosses the Canadian Pacific Railway tracks and crosses under MN 100 and avoids a pond by circling south. It goes by Schaper Park and goes into Theodore Wirth Park. It intersects several mountain bike trails, and ends at Theodore Wirth Parkway.

History of the trail

The Electric Short Line Railway was a system that was built from 1917-1927. It extended from Minneapolis to Gluek, and it served the small towns in between. The railway changed hands a few times before being abandoned throughout the late 1960s to early 1970s. The new trail was completed west of Plymouth after the line was abandoned. The trail was built after the railroad was dismantled in 1995.

 of the DNR Segment was paved in 2014, from Winsted to Hutchinson. The project cost $2.2 million, and is the longest paved section built at one time by the DNR. The DNR hopes to paved the entire trail east of Hutchinson.

See also
 Cycling in Minnesota
 Rail trail

References

Bike paths in Minnesota
Rail trails in Minnesota
Shared-use paths in Minneapolis